Gaëtan Coucke (born 3 November 1998) is a Belgian professional footballer who plays for Belgian First Division A club Mechelen.

Club career
Coucke progressed from the youth team at Genk, having started at the club as a ball boy. He joined Lommel during the 2018–19 season on a one-year loan deal. On July 1, Coucke joined KV Mechelen after his contract at Genk was not extended.

International career
He was called up to the senior Belgium squad in November 2020, and was on the bench for the game against Denmark on 18 November.

Honours
Genk
Belgian Super Cup: 2019

References

External links

1998 births
Living people
People from Tongeren
Footballers from Limburg (Belgium)
Belgian footballers
Association football goalkeepers
K.R.C. Genk players
Lommel S.K. players
K.V. Mechelen players
Belgian Pro League players
Challenger Pro League players
Belgium youth international footballers